Mboko is a region in southern Cameroon. It may also refer to :

Culture 
Mboko language, Congo
Mboko people, Cameroon
their Wumboko language
Mboko dialect of Chung-Mboko language

People 
Ayrton Mboko (born 1997), Belgian footballer
Victoria Mboko (born 2006), Canadian tennis player

‘’’Mboko’’’ is the name given to a very big pumpkin that can also be used to make shells of the mbira instrument. It is originally from the Karanga Tribe